Đông Hòa is a town in Phú Yên Province, Vietnam. Đông Hòa may also refer to:

 Đông Hòa, Bình Dương, a ward of Dĩ An
 , a rural commune of Thái Bình city
 , a rural commune of Trảng Bom District
 , a rural commune of An Minh District
 , a rural commune of Đông Sơn District
 , a rural commune of Châu Thành District, Tiền Giang Province

See also 
Đồng Hóa (disambiguation)